Lobby Music is a record company, headquartered in Paleo Faliro, Greece, founded in 2010 by composer Nektarios Bitros. The record company has released several songs from notable artists of the Greek music industry.

The makers of the record company managed in the first five years of operation to sign contracts with several established Greek artists as well as new artists. Lobby Music has been credited with platinum and gold albums from releases.

Artists 
The following artists are members of Lobby Music.

Themis Adamantidis
Giorgos Daskoulidis
Angela Dimitriou
Stelios Dionisiou
Zafeiris Melas
Angelos Michail
Konstantinos Rallis
Vasilis Terlegas
Chara Verra

Former artists
These artists were formerly with Lobby.

Popi Maliotaki
Alekos Zazopoulos

References

External links
Official website
Official YouTube channel

Record labels established in 2010
Greek record labels
Companies based in Attica